John Bramley-Moore (1800 – 19 November 1886) was an English politician and chairman of Mersey Docks and Harbour Board.

Life
The youngest son of Thomas Moore, he was born in Leeds, and assumed his additional name of Bramley in 1841. As a young man he went out to Brazil to engage in commerce, and lived for several years at Rio de Janeiro, where in 1828 he entertained the officers of the exploring ships HMS Beagle and HMS Adventure. Much of the wealth he acquired in Brazil was derived from slave-worked exports and illicit slave-trading. On his return to England in 1835 he settled at Liverpool as a merchant.

In 1841 Bramley-Moore was elected by Liverpool town council as an alderman, an office which he held for 24 years. In 1841 he became a member of the dock committee (afterwards called the dock board), and in the following year was appointed chairman. He worked for the 1846 arrangement with the Earl of Derby, by which two miles of the foreshore of the River Mersey, from the borough boundary to Bootle, became available for the construction of docks. After the opening of the Albert Dock by Prince Albert in 1846 he was offered a knighthood, which he declined. Five other docks were opened on 4 August 1848, one of them receiving the name of Bramley-Moore Dock. 

Bramley-Moore was elected Lord Mayor of Liverpool in November 1848, and during his year of office originated a fancy fair and bazaar by which money was raised for the local hospitals. In politics he was a Conservative, and was returned to Parliament in 1854 as Member for Maldon. He lost his seat in 1859, but then represented Lincoln from 1862 to 1865. He was an unsuccessful candidate for Kingston upon Hull in 1852, for Liverpool in 1853, and Lymington in 1859.

For many years Bramley-Moore was chairman of the Brazilian chamber of commerce in Liverpool, and lobbied the government to reduce the  duties on coffee and sugar. In 1863 he made a speech in parliament on the subject of the relations of England with Brazil, for which he was decorated with the Order of the Rose by the Emperor Pedro II of Brazil.

Some years before his retirement from business Bramley-Moore went to live at Gerrard's Cross, Buckinghamshire, where he built a free reading-room. He died at Brighton on 19 November 1886, aged 86, and was buried at St. Michael's-in-the-Hamlet, Toxteth Park, Liverpool.

Family
Moore married in 1830 Seraphina Hibernia, daughter of William Pennell, British consul-general for Brazil, and left two sons, the Rev. William Joseph Bramley-Moore, a clergyman of the Church of England, and author of theological works, and John Arthur Bramley-Moore (died 10 July 1899).

Notes

Attribution

External links 
 
 

1800 births
1886 deaths
Conservative Party (UK) MPs for English constituencies
Councillors in Liverpool
UK MPs 1852–1857
UK MPs 1857–1859
UK MPs 1859–1865
Members of Parliament for Maldon
19th-century English businesspeople